This is a very incomplete list of Gaelic footballers who have played at senior level for the Mayo county team.

List of players

B
 Chris Barrett: 13 seasons, until 2020: 85 appearances (47 championship appearances)
 Colm Boyle: 2008–2021, 120 appearances 
 Peter Burke

C
 Ger Cafferkey: Until 2019, 104 league and championship appearances
 David Clarke, 2002–2020, 133 appearances (56 championship appearances)
 Joe Corcoran: Until 1974, 96 appearances, scored 20 goals and 358 points

D
 Alan Dillon
 Ray Dempsey

F
 Anthony Finnerty
 Dermot Flanagan

H
 Keith Higgins: 2005–2020, 75 championship appearances
 Pat Holmes
 James Horan

I
 Gabriel Irwin

M
 Ciarán McDonald: 1994–2007
 Liam McHale
 Colm McManamon
 Kevin McStay
 Andy Moran: Until 2019
 Conor Mortimer
 Michael Moyles

N
 James Nallen

O
 Séamus O'Shea: Until 2020

P
 Willie Joe Padden
 Tom Parsons: 2008–2020, 84 appearances

V
 Donal Vaughan: 12 years, until 2020

References

Lists of inter-county Gaelic football players
Players